Carex cognata is a species of sedge (family Cyperaceae), with an Afromontane distribution. A wetland obligate, it is typically, but not always, found at high altitudes.

References

cognata
Afromontane flora
Flora of Ethiopia
Flora of Uganda
Flora of Tanzania
Flora of South Tropical Africa
Flora of Southern Africa
Plants described in 1837